Sahej Paath (Punjabi: ਸਹਜ ਪਾਠ) or Sadharan Paath (Punjabi: ਸਧਾਰਨ ਪਾਠ) or even "Khula Paath" literally means easy or simple recitation. It is a paath (recitation) which may be started and ended at any time; with as many or as few people participating as desired. The recitation of the Guru Granth Sahib is started at the beginning of the Granth Sahib and the whole of the 1430 pages of the Guru Granth is read in a slow fashion over from seven days to, in some cases, over several months. It is a slow and non-regular, non-urgent reading of the whole of the Guru Granth Sahib.

It is a good time to practice pronunciation and study meanings. Someone can even listen and correct the reader during the recitation. Anyone can perform their own Sahej Paath. This is the way a beginner would usually do the first few Paaths of the Guru Granth Sahib.

See also 
Akhand Paath

References

Sikh terminology